Bethanie is a town in Bojanala District Municipality in the North West province of South Africa.

Bethanie is a station of the Hermannsburg Mission, established in 1864, and is 37 km northeast of Rustenburg. The name is of biblical origin, and is Hebrew for 'house of sorrow or misery'.

Bethanie is the capital town of Bakwena Ba Mogopa, a SeTswana-speaking traditional community.

Demographics 
The station hosts multiple races.

History 
It is part of 15 villages that form part of Bakwena Ba Mogopa nation. The village was previously a farm called Losperfontein, owned by Tjaart Kruger, President Paul Kruger's younger brother. The community purchased the farm around 1866, with the assistance of missionary Wilhelm Behrenssen, and it was renamed Bethanie.

Facilities 
Bethanie has a police station that renders services to nearby places such as Modikoe and Berseba.

References 

Populated places in the Rustenburg Local Municipality